Kálmán Thaly (3 January 1839, Csép – 26 September 1909, Zablát) was a Hungarian poet, historian and politician. His most important works are his Kuruc poetry, the most famous literary forgery in the history of Hungarian literature.

Work
Thaly started out as a poet. His poem collections, which appeared between 1857 and 1861, are tinged with a nationalistic fervor. They include Do not hurt the Hungarians (1857), Zengo Park (1859), Carpathian Horn (1860), Szekely Horn (1861), and Dawn of Freedom (1861). Later Thaly was increasingly attracted to history.

Political career
Besides being a poet, Thaly was also a parliamentarian. He was also a member of the Hungarian Academy of Sciences. He held an influential place in the country's military affairs. He was instrumental in the founding of the Historical Society, and edited its journal.

Patriotic Spirit
Thaly was highly patriotic. As a Hungarian national, he supported Francis II Rákóczi. In 1873, Thaly started a movement to exhume the grave of Rákóczi, and bring home his remains. Thaly dream was realized only in October 1906, when the remains of his hero were brought home to Hungary.

Works

Thaly's intense patriotism came through in his books. He wrote five books during his life, all of which bear an unmistakable mark of nationalism.

References

External links
 
 

19th-century Hungarian historians
Hungarian politicians
19th-century Hungarian poets
Hungarian male poets
1839 births
1909 deaths
19th-century Hungarian male writers